High School of Commerce may refer to the following schools:

Canada
 High School of Commerce (Ottawa)

United States
 High School of Commerce (Detroit), 1922–1964
 High School of Commerce (San Francisco) 
 High School of Commerce (Massachusetts), in Springfield

See also
 Commercial High School, Atlanta, Georgia
 Commercial High School (New Orleans) 
 Commercial high school (Japan), a type of school